The Battle of the Palouse refers to an athletic rivalry in the northwest United States, between the Vandals of the University of Idaho and Cougars of Washington State University.

The two schools' most prominent rivalry was in football, but in later years it has shifted to men's basketball.

Football

Series history
The first game was played  in November 1894 and resulted in a win for Washington State. The game in 1898 was not played because Idaho had an ineligible ringer from Lapwai, David McFarland, a recent All-American from Carlisle. The Vandals' first-ever forward pass was attempted against the Cougars in 1907: it was completed for a touchdown from a drop-kick formation in the fourth quarter and led to a 

Washington State has dominated the local rivalry, holding a  lead; the record since 1926 is even more dominant, with a  advantage for the Cougars. The longest winning streak for Idaho was three games  and has only five victories since that three-peat (1954, 1964, 1965, 1999, & 2000) and two ties (1927, 1950) to offset the 58 losses.

The games were skipped in 1969 and 1971, unfortunate for Idaho as the 1971 Vandals posted one of the best records  in school history, while WSU  The rivalry became increasingly one-sided as WSU dominated in the 1970s (except for 1974) and the original series ended, following the 1978 game. From 1979 to 1997, the game was played just twice (1982, 1989) until the 10-year renewal from 1998–2007. Since their last wins in 1999 and 2000, Idaho has been physically outmatched in most of the ten games; the game has been played three times since 2007, in 2013, 2016, and 2022.

As two schools are in close proximity, there was a tradition called The Loser's Walk from 1938 to 1968; a week following the game, students of the losing school walked from their campus to the winners', then received rides back home from the winning side. This has frequently been misreported as students walking back to their own campus immediately following the game. In 1954, the walk made national news when about 2,000 students from Washington State College made the trek east from Pullman to Moscow after the Cougars lost to Idaho for the first time in 29 years.

In a span of less than five months, from November 1969 to April 1970, both schools' aged wooden stadiums (Idaho's Neale Stadium and WSU's Rogers Field) burned down due to suspected arson. The WSU–Idaho game in 1970 was dubbed the Displaced Bowl, which was held in Joe Albi Stadium in Spokane on September 19. The Cougars won the game (their only win that season), as well as the next ten against the Vandals. This was the first in the rivalry played on AstroTurf, which was new to Joe Albi that season.

In 1978, the NCAA split Division I football in two: I-A (now FBS) and I-AA (now FCS). Washington State was in Division I-A as part of the Pac-10 Conference and Idaho downgraded to I-AA as part of the Big Sky Conference, whose other football members moved up from Division II. In the late 1970s, I-A football programs were allowed 50% more scholarships and twice as many assistant coaches as I-AA teams. During the years they were in different divisions, the schools met only twice (1982 in Spokane and 1989 in Pullman). In 1996, Idaho moved back up to Division I-A in the Big West Conference, and Idaho and WSU rekindled their century-old rivalry. Since the rivalry was reinstated in 1998, every game has been played at Martin Stadium in Pullman, except for the matchup in 2003, which was played at Seattle's Seahawks Stadium.

Future of rivalry
After ten years of the renewed rivalry, Vandal head coach Robb Akey, previously WSU's defensive coordinator, said in 2008 that he preferred the game not be played every year, instead saying he would prefer it as a "once-in-a-while thing." Only one game was played during Akey's tenure, in his first season in 2007, and he was fired in October 2012. The meeting in 2013 on September 21 was a one-year revival, and WSU  in 2016. Because of the difficulty of scheduling as an isolated FBS independent, Idaho returned to FCS and the Big Sky in 2018. There was a meeting scheduled for 2020, but it was canceled due to complications arising from the COVID-19 pandemic; the teams played next in 2022, a 24–17 Cougar win. Future meetings are currently scheduled for 2025, 2027, and 2029.

Game results

 Both were members of the Pacific Coast Conference; the Battle of the Palouse was a conference game from 1922 through 1958.
 Idaho was a division below WSU in 1967–68 (College division) and 1978–95 (Division I-AA); Idaho returned to FCS in 2018.  
 Prior to 1959, WSU was WSC.
 The only one to serve as head coach for both programs is Dennis Erickson, who lost to the Cougars twice while at Idaho (1982, 2006);the game was not played when he was at WSU (1987, 1988).
 The 1918 game was non-varsity, composed of Student Army Training Corps (SATC)  After the Armistice of November 11ending World War I, a limited schedule was played; Idaho defeated Washington State's SATC team 7–6 in Moscow on December 7.

Coaching records
Since 1919

Idaho

 Won first attempt: Stahley (1954), Musseau (1965), Cable (2000)
 Won final attempt: Mathews (1925), Andros (1964), Tormey (1999)
 Only Idaho coach with more than one win was Mathews, with three straight (1923, 1924, 1925)

Washington State

 Last tie was in 1950, overtime began in 1996 in Division I-A (none through 2022)
 Two games were played in 1945; no games in 1943, 1944, 1969, 1971 
 After 1978, except for resumption of 1998–2007, games were scheduled intermittently (1982, 1989, 2013, 2016, 2022, 2025)

Men's basketball

Although the Battle of the Palouse in football waned by the 1980s, Idaho and Washington State men's basketball teams have played each other annually since 1906 in a series that continues. From 1922 through the  season, both were members of the Pacific Coast Conference, and both were independents for the next several years after it disbanded. Four games per season were played in these years, sometimes five; during the Gus Johnson season of 1962–63, Idaho won four of five.

Washington State has a  lead in the series through the December 2018 game in Pullman, which the Cougars won   three of the previous four; the Vandals' win in December 2014 was their first over the Cougars since 2002 and the first in Pullman 

The rivalry in basketball reached its peak in the early 1980s, when alumnus Don Monson was Idaho's head coach and WSU was led by  The game in early December 1982 at the Kibbie Dome in Moscow established a new attendance record of 11,000 for an Idaho home game; the Vandals won in overtime for their third straight win over the Cougars and 37th consecutive win  Idaho was coming off a  season in 1982 in which it was ranked in the top ten and reached the Sweet Sixteen (and Monson was named Kodak coach of the year). The Cougars went on to finish second in the Pac-10 in the 1983 regular season, and advanced to the second round of the NCAA tournament, falling to #1 seed Virginia in Boise to finish at  Both coaches left at the end of the season; Monson for Oregon and Raveling for Iowa.

Game results
Since 1950: Washington State leads,

Other sports
The "Battle of the Palouse" is also contested in men's and women's basketball, women's volleyball, and women's soccer.

In soccer, Idaho began its program in 1998 and the teams first met in 1999. They have played twelve times, most recently in 2015, and the Cougars have won eleven straight; the sole Vandal victory came 

In volleyball, Washington State leads the series  through 2019. The series started  in 1976, and they often met multiple times per season in the first decade. In recent years, the series has been played as part of invitational tournaments hosted by the schools: Since 2000, WSU leads  

Met twice in 2006 (split), did not play in 2011, 2017, or 2018.

In baseball, the rivalry was at its strongest in the 1960s, when both made multiple appearances in the NCAA postseason.

Boxing was also part of the rivalry as both had prominent national programs: Washington State won the national title in 1937 and Idaho took three (1940, 1941, 1950), the last shared with Gonzaga. In a UI–WSC dual meet in 1950, over five thousand attended at the Vandals'  The sport was dropped by Idaho in 1954, and discontinued by the NCAA

See also
 List of NCAA college football rivalry games

References

External links
College Football Data Warehouse  – Idaho  opponents: vs. Washington State

College basketball rivalries in the United States
College football rivalries in the United States
Idaho Vandals football
Washington State Cougars football
Idaho Vandals men's basketball
Washington State Cougars men's basketball